"Inní mér syngur vitleysingur" (Icelandic for "Within me a lunatic sings") is the second track on Sigur Rós' fifth album, Með suð í eyrum við spilum endalaust. It is the first single from the album and was released on 8 September 2008.

A music video for "Inní mér syngur vitleysingur" was also released. It shows the band playing at the free Náttúra (Nature) concert in Reykjavík on 28 June 2008.

Vocals from this track were sampled by the experimental electronic duo, Crystal Castles, in the song "Year of Silence", on their second self-titled release Crystal Castles.

Track listing

Personnel
Sigur Rós
 Jón Þór Birgisson - vocals, guitar
 Georg Hólm - bass
 Kjartan Sveinsson - keyboard, piano
 Orri Páll Dýrason - drums

Charts

Release history

Notes

Sigur Rós songs
2008 singles
Song recordings produced by Flood (producer)
Icelandic-language songs
2008 songs
EMI Records singles
Songs written by Jónsi
Songs written by Orri Páll Dýrason
Songs written by Georg Hólm
Songs written by Kjartan Sveinsson